Ara Gevorgyan (born April 19, 1960) is an Armenian musician, composer and musical producer. In 2004 he was awarded the Honorary Artist of the Republic of Armenia title by the President Robert Kocharyan.

Biography
Gevorgyan is the son of Armenian folk-singer Valya Samvelyan. He studied at School #31 of Yerevan and at the A. Tigranyan Musical School at the same time. During the two years he studied at Yerevan #8 college of Fine Arts. From 1983 to 1987 he studied at Armenian State Pedagogical University at the faculty of woodwind instruments and pop music department. In 1987-1989 Gevorgyan taught conducting at the same Institute, then he worked at Armenian Television ("3 Alik" TV program).

In 1983 he founded the "Rally" Armenian pop-rock band, the participant of "Song-85" festival.

He participated in the Opening Ceremony of the Cultural Year of Armenia in Russia hosted at the Moscow Kremlin Music Hall and honored by the presence of the presidents of Armenia and Russia Robert Kocharyan and Vladimir Putin respectively and the famous French-Armenian singer Charles Aznavour .

Ara Gevorgyan co-operates with Jivan Gasparyan, Ian Gillan, Demis Roussos, Pedro Eustache, Daniel Decker and others. Among his most popular songs are "Adana", "Artsakh", "Ov Hayots Ashkharh" and "Ovkyanosits ayn koghm". Gevorgyan also composed the music for Russian prima ballerina Anastasia Volochkova's "Golden cage" ballet dedicated to the Bolshoi Theater.

He is married, has a daughter and a son.

He has been awarded by the "Mikhail Lomonosov" Russian medal and the gold medal of the Ministry of Culture of Armenia.

Discography

CDs
1995  (Over the ocean)
1997  (Nostalgie)
1999  (Ani) (a prize winner of Armenian Music Awards in the US)
2001  (Khor Virap) (a prize winner of Armenian Music Awards in the US).
2005  (Adana)
2009  (Vagharshapat) (a prize winner of Armenian Music Awards in the US).
2010 "The Best of Ara Gevorgyan"

DVDs
1999 "Live in Alex Theater", Los Angeles, EYE Records
2002 "My Sardarapat", live in Armenia
2003 "Ov Hayots Ashkhar"
2007 "Live in Kremlin", Moscow, Russia
2009 "Live in Citadel", Aleppo, Syria
2009 "The Best of Ara Gevorgyan

References

External links
Ara Gevorgian's Official site
Ara Gevorgyan-My Sardarabad
Gevorgyan at MTV.AM
Armenian Music Center
Ara Gevorgian's Concert Video - My Sardarapad
ԱՐԱ ԳԵՎՈՐԳՅԱՆ

1960 births
Living people
Musicians from Yerevan
Armenian State Pedagogical University alumni